Sidlaghatta is a town in the Chikkaballapur district in the Indian state of Karnataka. It is known for raw silk.  All the taluk administration lies with the taluk panchayat for the implementation of developmental schemes and their progress.

Geography
Sidlaghatta has an average elevation of 878 metres (2880 feet). 1.5 km south to north

Demographics
, Sidlaghatta had a population of 41,105. Males constitute 52% of the population and females 48%. Sidlaghatta has an average literacy rate of 62%, higher than the national average of 59.5%: male literacy is 67%, and female literacy is 56%. In Sidlaghatta, 14% of the population is under 6 years of age.

Notable residents
N. R. Narayana Murthy - Indian businessman

References

Cities and towns in Chikkaballapur district